Strangford Lough (from Old Norse Strangr Fjörðr, meaning "strong sea-inlet") is a large sea loch or inlet in County Down, in the east of Northern Ireland. It is the largest inlet in Ireland and the British Isles, covering . The lough is almost fully enclosed by the Ards Peninsula and is linked to the Irish Sea by a long narrow channel at its southeastern edge. The main body of the lough has at least seventy islands along with many islets (pladdies), bays, coves, headlands and mudflats. Historically it was called 'Lough Coan' (Irish Loch Cuan, "sea-inlet of bays/havens"), while 'Strangford' referred to the narrow sea channel. It is part of the 'Strangford and Lecale' Area of Outstanding Natural Beauty. Strangford Lough was designated as Northern Ireland's first Marine Conservation Zone in 2013, and has been designated a Special Area of Conservation for its important wildlife.

Strangford Lough is a popular tourist destination noted for its fishing and scenery. Towns and villages around the lough include Killyleagh, Comber, Newtownards, Portaferry and Strangford. The latter two straddle either shore of the narrow Strangford channel, and are connected by a car ferry.

Name
The name Strangford comes . The Vikings were active in the area during the Middle Ages. Originally, this name referred only to the narrow channel linking the lough to the sea (between the villages of Strangford and Portaferry). Up until about the 18th century, the main body of the lough was better known by the (older) Irish name Loch Cuan, meaning "loch of the bays/havens". This name was anglicized as Lough Coan, Lough Cone, Lough Coyn, Lough Coin, or similar.

The narrow channel may have been known in Latin as the fretum Brene. In Ulster-Scots the lough's name is spelt Strangfurd or  Strangfirt Loch.

Ptolemy's Geography (2nd century AD) described a point called Ουινδεριος (Winderios, "pleasant river") which may have referred to Strangford Lough.

Geology

Flora

Flowering plants

Common cord-grass (Spartina anglica) C.E. Hubbard was introduced in the mid-1940s is now abundant.

Algae
Maerl is a calcareous deposit, in the main, of two species, of calcareous algae Phymatolithon calcareum and Lithothamnion glaciale which form free-living beds of unattached, branched corallines, living or dead, in Strangford Lough.

The rocky and boulder shores toward the south of the lough are dominated by the seaweed knotted wrack Ascophyllum nodosum. The usual zonation of weeds on these shore is, at the top channel wrack (Pelvetia canaliculata (L.) Dcne. et Rhur.), followed by spiral wrack (Fucus spiralis L.), then knotted wrack (Ascophyllum nodosum (L.) Le Jol) with some admixture of bladder wrack (Fucus vesiculosus) L. and then serrated wrack (Fucus serratus L.) before coming to the low water kelps.

Other algae include:

Fauna
Strangford Lough and Islands is an Important Bird Area.
Strangford Lough is an important winter migration destination for many wading and sea birds. Animals commonly found in the lough include common seals, basking sharks and brent geese. Three quarters of the world population of pale bellied brent geese spend winter in the lough area. Often the numbers are up to 15,000. The Castle Espie wetland reserve sits on the banks of the lough near Comber.

The invasive carpet sea squirt, Didemnum vexillum, was found in the Lough in 2012.

Tidal electricity

In 2007 Strangford Lough became home to the world's first commercial tidal stream power station, SeaGen. The 1.2 megawatt underwater tidal electricity generator, part of Northern Ireland's Environment and Renewable Energy Fund scheme, took advantage of the fast tidal flow in the lough which can be up to 4 m/s. Although the generator was powerful enough to power up to a thousand homes, the turbine had a minimal environmental impact, as it was almost entirely submerged, and the rotors turned slowly enough that they pose no danger to wildlife.

In 2008 a tidal energy device called Evopod was tested in Strangford Lough near the Portaferry Ferry landing. The device was a 1/10 scale prototype, monitored by Queen's University Belfast. The device was a semi-submerged floating tidal turbine, moored to the seabed via a buoy-mounted swivel. The scale device was not grid connected.

Sports

In July 2016, the Strangford Lough and Lecale Partnership, Scottish Coastal Rowing Association, Newry, Mourne and Down District Council and Ards and North Down Borough Council hosted the "Skiffie Worlds 2016" rowing championships. The event was attended by 50 clubs from Scotland, England, Northern Ireland, the Netherlands, The United States, Canada and Tasmania. Racing was held over a 2 km course on Strangford Lough at Delamont Country Park.

Ferry

The Portaferry–Strangford ferry service has linked Portaferry and Strangford, at the mouth of the Lough, without a break and for almost four centuries. The subsidised public service carries both passengers and vehicles, and operates at a loss of more than £1m per year but is viewed as an important transport link to the Ards Peninsula.

See also
List of loughs in Ireland
Nendrum Monastery

References

Further reading
Boaden, P.J.S., O'Connor, R.J. and Seed, R. The composition and zonation of a Fucus serratus community in Strangford Lough, Co. Down. J. exp. Biol. Ecol. 17: 111 - 136 (1975).
Crosbie, Jane E. M.; Brown, Alison (illus). Strangford's Shores: Paintings and Stories from around the Lough. Cottage Publications, 1996.
Deane, C.Douglas. Mammals of Strangford Lough. In Anon (Editor) Strangford Lough. 22 - 23. National Trust, Belfast, 1971.
Hill, Ian; Le Garsmeur, Alain (photo). Strangford: Portrait of an Irish Lough. Blackstaff Press, 2007.
Walsh, B. Catching the Currents. Time 173 no.4. p. 44 (2009).

External links

Strangford Lough Online
JNCC Special Area of Conservation Selection

Areas of Outstanding Natural Beauty in County Down
Important Bird Areas of Northern Ireland
Special Protection Areas in Northern Ireland
Special Areas of Conservation in County Down
Portaferry
Strangford
Newtownards
Marine reserves of Northern Ireland
Ramsar sites in Northern Ireland
Landforms of County Down
Inlets of Northern Ireland